iNaturalist is a social network of naturalists, citizen scientists, and biologists built on the concept of mapping and sharing observations of biodiversity across the globe. iNaturalist may be accessed via its website or from its mobile applications. , iNaturalist users had contributed approximately 115,651,000 observations of plants, animals, fungi, and other organisms worldwide, and around 245,700 users were active in the previous 30 days.

iNaturalist describes itself as "an online social network of people sharing biodiversity information to help each other learn about nature", with its primary goal being to connect people to nature. Although it is not a science project itself, iNaturalist is a platform for science and conservation efforts, providing valuable open data to research projects, land managers, other organizations, and the public. It is the primary application for crowd-sourced biodiversity data in places such as Mexico, southern Africa, and Australia, and the project has been called "a standard-bearer for natural history mobile applications." Most of iNaturalist's software is open source.

History
iNaturalist began in 2008 as a UC Berkeley School of Information Master's final project of Nate Agrin, Jessica Kline, and Ken-ichi Ueda. Agrin and Ueda continued work on the site with Sean McGregor, a web developer. In 2011, Ueda began collaboration with Scott Loarie, a research fellow at Stanford University and lecturer at UC Berkeley. Ueda and Loarie are the current co-directors of iNaturalist.org. The organization merged with the California Academy of Sciences on April 24, 2014. In 2017, iNaturalist became a joint initiative between the California Academy of Sciences and the National Geographic Society.

Since 2012, the number of participants and observations has roughly doubled each year. In 2014, iNaturalist reached 1 million observations and  there were 115 million observations (102 million verifiable).

Platforms

Users can interact with iNaturalist in several ways:

 through the iNaturalist.org website,
 through two mobile apps: iNaturalist (iOS/Android) and Seek by iNaturalist (iOS/Android), or
 through partner organizations such as the Global Biodiversity Information Facility (GBIF) website.

On the iNaturalist.org website, visitors can search the public dataset and interact with other people adding observations and identifications. The website provides tools for registered users to add, identify, and discuss observations, write journal posts, explore information about species, and create project pages to recruit participation in and coordinate work on their topics of interest.

On the iNaturalist mobile app, registered users can create and share nature observations to the online dataset, explore observations both nearby and around the world, and learn about different species.

Seek by iNaturalist, a separate app marketed to families, requires no online account registration and all observations may remain private. Seek incorporates features of gamification, such as providing a list of nearby organisms to find and encouraging the collection of badges and participation in challenges. Seek was initially released in the spring of 2018.

Observations
The iNaturalist platform is based on crowdsourcing of observations and identifications. An iNaturalist observation records a person's encounter with an individual organism at a particular time and place. An iNaturalist observation may also record evidence of an organism, such as animal tracks, nests, or scat. The scope of iNaturalist excludes natural but inert subjects such as geologic or hydrologic features. Users typically upload photos as evidence of their findings, though audio recordings are also accepted and such evidence is not a strict requirement. Users may share observation locations publicly, "obscure" them to display a less precise location, or make the locations completely private.

On iNaturalist, other users add identifications to each other's observations in order to confirm or improve the identification of the observation. Observations are classified as "Casual," "Needs ID" (needs identification), or "Research Grade" based on the quality of the data provided and the community identification process. Any quality of data can be downloaded from iNaturalist and "Research Grade" observations are often incorporated into other online databases such as the Global Biodiversity Information Facility and the Atlas of Living Australia.

Automated species identification
In addition to observations being identified by others in the community, iNaturalist includes an automated species identification tool, first released in 2017. Images can be identified via a computer vision model which has been trained on the large database of the observations on iNaturalist. Multiple species suggestions are typically provided with the suggestion that the software guesses to be most likely is at the top of the list. A broader taxon such as a genus or family is commonly provided if the model is unsure of the species. It is trained once or twice a year, and the threshold for species included in the training set has changed over time.  It can be difficult for the model to guess correctly if the species in question is infrequently observed or hard to identify from images alone; or if the image submitted has poor lighting, is blurry, or contains multiple subjects.

Projects

Users have created and contributed to tens of thousands of different projects on iNaturalist. The platform is commonly used to record observations during bioblitzes, which are biological surveying events that attempt to record all the species that occur within a designated area, and a specific project type on iNaturalist. Other project types include collections of observations by location or taxon, or documenting specific types of observations such as animal tracks and signs, the spread of invasive species, roadkill, fishing catches, or discovering new species. In 2011, iNaturalist was used as a platform to power the Global Amphibian and Global Reptile BioBlitzes, in which observations were used to help monitor the occurrence and distribution of the world's reptiles and amphibian species. The US National Park Service partnered with iNaturalist to record observations from the 2016 National Parks BioBlitz. That project exceeded 100,000 observations in August 2016. In 2017, the United Nations Environment Programme teamed up with iNaturalist to celebrate World Environment Day.. In 2022, Reef Ecologic teamed up with iNaturalist to celebrate World Oceans Day.

City Nature Challenge

In 2016, Lila Higgins from the Natural History Museum of Los Angeles County and Alison Young from the California Academy of Sciences co-founded the City Nature Challenge (CNC). In the first City Nature Challenge, naturalists in Los Angeles and the San Francisco Bay Area documented over 20,000 observations with the iNaturalist platform. In 2017, the CNC expanded to 16 cities across the United States and collected over 125,000 observations of wildlife in 5 days. The CNC expanded to a global audience in 2018, with 68 cities participating from 19 countries, with some cities using community science platforms other than iNaturalist to participate. In 4 days, over 17,000 people cataloged over 440,000 nature observations in urban regions around the world. In 2019, the CNC once again expanded, with 35,000 participants in 159 cities collecting 964,000 observations of over 31,000 species. Although fewer observations were documented during the 2020 City Nature Challenge during the COVID-19 pandemic (when the CNC became collaborative as opposed to competitive), more cities and people participated and more species were found than in previous years.

Licensing
Users have the option to license their observations, photos, and audio recordings in several ways, including for the public domain, Creative Commons, or with all rights reserved. To encourage the sharing of information and to reduce costs, iNaturalist encourages users to license media with Creative Commons licenses. The default license is CC BY-NC, meaning others are free to copy, redistribute, remix, transform, and build upon the media as long as appropriate credit is given, changes are indicated, a link to the license is provided, and it is not used for commercial purposes.

Observations and media licensed with Creative Commons licenses are often shared elsewhere, including the Global Biodiversity Information Facility (excluding share-alike and no derivatives licenses), Atlas of Living Australia, and Wikipedia (excluding noncommercial and no derivatives licenses) through regular imports or user scripts such as iNaturalist2Commons and Wiki Loves iNaturalist.

The iNaturalist website and mobile apps are open-source software released under the MIT License.

Research using iNaturalist data
As of January 2022, more than 2,000 research results have been published that cite the iNaturalist research-grade observations hosted on the Global Biodiversity Information Facility (GBIF), often in the fields of ecology, conservation, and climate change. Many articles focus on climate-driven range shifts and expansions. For example, in 2015, data from iNaturalist was used to show that the Hopkin's rose nudibranch (Okenia rosacea) is moving northward. Other articles focus on the description of new species or rediscovery of species previously considered extinct. For example, a species of snail, Myxostoma petiverianum, first described in the 1700s, was also rediscovered in Vietnam. Additionally, in 2013, a citizen scientist in Colombia uploaded a photo of a poison dart frog, which researchers determined was a previously unrecognized species now known as Andinobates cassidyhornae. Other research has focused on the morphology or coloration of species observations. For example, a study in 2019 assessed the relationship between wing coloration and temperature in the dragonfly species Pachydiplax longipennis.

Graphs

Notes

References

External links

 

Biology websites
Citizen science
Internet properties established in 2008
Biodiversity databases
Wild animals identification
Mobile applications